Late Night Tales: Metronomy is a mix album compiled by Joseph Mount of English band Metronomy, released on 3 September 2012 as part of the Late Night Tales series.

The mix features tracks from artists such as OutKast, Autechre, The Alan Parsons Project, Chick Corea and Cat Power. Paul Morley contributes the spoken word piece, "Lost for Words Pt.4".

Metronomy also recorded an exclusive cover version of Jean Michel Jarre’s ‘Hypnose’.

Mick Karn's track "Weather The Windmill", included in the compilation, would later be sampled heavily in Metronomy's track "Mick Slow" on their 2016 album Summer 08.

Track listing
ALNCD29

References

External links
Official Metronomy website
Official Late Night Tales: Metronomy Page

2012 compilation albums
Metronomy
Metronomy albums